Yamatentomon is a genus of proturans in the family Acerentomidae.

Species
 Yamatentomon breviseta Szeptycki & Imadaté, 1987
 Yamatentomon fujisanum Imadaté, 1964
 Yamatentomon kunnepchupi Imadaté, 1964
 Yamatentomon kurosai Imadaté, 1974
 Yamatentomon yamato (Imadaté & Yosii, 1956)

References

Protura